The office of the Surveyor of the King's/Queen's Pictures, in the Royal Collection Department of the Royal Household of the Sovereign of the United Kingdom, is responsible for the care and maintenance of the royal collection of pictures owned by the Sovereign in an official capacity – as distinct from those owned privately and displayed at Sandringham House and Balmoral Castle and elsewhere. The office has only been full-time since 1972. It now operates in a professional capacity with a staff of a dozen people. As of the end of 2020, the position has been put in abeyance.

Although the office dates from 1625, there has always been someone responsible for pictures in the Royal Household. Notable recent office-holders have included Sir Lionel Cust (1901–1927), Sir Kenneth Clark (1934–1944), Professor Anthony Blunt (1945–1972), one of the infamous Cambridge Five, and Sir Oliver Millar (1972–1988). The post of Surveyor of the King's Pictures is currently in abeyance; the most recent was Desmond Shawe-Taylor, who held the post from 2005 to 2020.

List of Surveyors of the King's/ Queen's Pictures
Desmond Shawe-Taylor  2005–2020
Christopher Lloyd,  1988–2005
Sir Oliver Millar  1972–1988
Anthony Blunt  1945–1973 – formerly Sir Anthony Blunt , until he was stripped of his titles after being exposed as a former Soviet spy.
Sir Kenneth Clark  1934–1944
C. H. Collins Baker  1928–1934
Sir Lionel Cust  1901–1927
Sir John Charles Robinson  1880–1901
Richard Redgrave  1856–1880
Thomas Uwins  1844–1856
Sir Augustus Wall Callcott  1843–1844
William Seguier 1820–1843
Benjamin West  1791–1820
Richard Dalton 1778–1791
George Knapton 1765–1778
Stephen Slaughter 1745–1765
Peter Walton c.1690–1745 (officially from 1701)
Frederick Sonnius 1690–1701
Henry Norris 1682–
Parry Walton 1679–1690 (officially to 1701)
Gerrit van Uylenburgh 1676–1679
William Chiffinch 1666–
Thomas Chiffinch 1660–1666
George Geldorp 1660–
Abraham van der Doort 1625–1640

References

Further reading

External links
About the Royal Collection – official website